Shongom is a Local Government Area (LGA) of Gombe State, Nigeria. Its headquarter is in the town of Boh in the northern part of the Local Government Area .

Geography 
Shongom LGA occupies a total area of 922 square kilometres and has an average temperature of 31 °C. The LGA witnesses two major seasons which are the rainy season, which usually comes between the months of May and September, and the dry season which is normally between the months of October and April.

Economy 
Trade is a critical economic activity in Shongom LG with the area hosting the expansive Lalaipido international cattle market where a variety of domestic animals are sold. Farming also blossoms in Shongom LGA with the area known for the cultivation of a number of food crops such as beans, rice, sorghum, guineacorn, and millet. Other occupations of the people of Shongom LGA include hunting, wood carving, and animal rearing.

Districts and villages
Bengunji; Bango, Bangunji, Bikutture, Bikwala, Bishiwai, Dilange (Dutse), Kalo, Kulan, Laluwa, Najeji, Suli, Yelchen-Yelchen.

Burak; Dabuki, Dajanwani, Kwanankukah, Lasanjang, Pirim, Sabonlayi, Shemyam, Tauni, Burak.

Filiya; Chengun, Disga, Farin-Kasa, Filiya, Jauro-Sajo, Lababali, Yapandi, Yarana.

Gundale; Anguwar Jauro Sule, Bebulo, Gundale, Gurwa, Kambuluk, Marke, Sakram, Swaja, Tudun Wada, Yelwa Gurwa.

Gwandum; Danjigiri, Garko, Golombi, Gujuba, Gwandum, Gwanlammeche, Gwere Yelwa, Katagum, Keffi, Kukah, Lalingling, Majidadi, Pamadu, Pilame, Popandi, Sabongari, Tambau, Toro, Yabayo, Yafuto.

Kushi; Dankunni, Dirang, Gomle, Kaure, Kommo, Kugwayam, Kushi, Ladongor, Lapandintai, Sabongari, Tanjania, Tatadar

Shongom; Amkolom, Boh, Kalishen, Karel, Kulishin, Labarya, Labayo, Labeke, Laduka, Lakenturum, Lakumji, Lalaipido, Lapan (Lapan), Lasadar, Lasanjang, Lasasap, Lashikoldok, Latatar, Latur, Lawishi, Layasakalak, Pokata, Tedmugzu.

Population 
The population of  Shongom in 2006 census was 151,520.

Postal Code 

The postal code of the area is 770.

Geographical Coordinates 
Latitude: 9.65, Longitude: 11.2167
9° 39′ 0″ North, 11° 13′ 0″ East

Area 
92,200 hectares
922.00 km² (355.99 sq mi)

Altitude 
383 m (1,257 ft)

Climate 
Tropical savanna climate.

Chairman of Shongom LGA 
The present Chairman of Shongom Local Government Area is Yohanna Nahari, from All Progressive Congress (APC).

References

Local Government Areas in Gombe State